Cham is a village in Howmeh-ye Sharqi Rural District, in the Central District of Izeh County, Khuzestan Province, Iran. As of the 2006 census, its population was 42, in 8 families.

References 

Populated places in Izeh County